Valerie Jones is a Canadian former figure skater. She is a two-time North American medalist (silver in 1967, bronze in 1965) and the 1967 Canadian national champion.

Results

References

skatabase

Canadian female single skaters
Living people
1948 births
20th-century Canadian women